Gerard Leonard (born March 30, 1936) is a Canadian retired professional hockey player who played 910 games in the Western Hockey League with the Edmonton Flyers and Seattle Totems from 1956 to 1970.

External links
 

1936 births
Living people
Ice hockey people from Edmonton
Edmonton Flyers (WHL) players
Seattle Totems (WHL) players
Canadian ice hockey centres